Web-oriented architecture (WOA) was coined in 2006 by Nick Gall of the Gartner's group. It is a software architecture style that extends service-oriented architecture (SOA) to web-based applications. 
WOA was originally created by many web applications and sites, such as social websites and personal websites.

Definitions 
The official Gartner definition of Web-Oriented Architecture:

Nick Gall also gives a mathematical formula for defining "WOA = SOA + WWW + REST".

Dion Hinchcliffe claims WOA to be:

The WOA stack
Distribution (HTTP, feeds)
Composition (Hypermedia, Mashups)
Security (OpenID, SSL)
Data Portability (XML, RDF)
Data Representation (ATOM, JSON)
Transfer Methods (REST, HTTP, BitTorrent)

Enterprise 
Enterprise Web Oriented Architecture (EWOA) is a sub-style of Enterprise Service Oriented Architecture (ESOA). 
EWOA is defined as the sets of web-based architectural elements, environments, principals and processes.
There is an expanding set of tools building mashups from WOA resources. These tools are beneficial to IT developers to create interoperability and integration.

New applications and websites, such as Google AdSense, Wikipedia and other RESTful services are using WOA, which is gaining attention from the research community and the industry.

Current WOA examples include Google's OpenSocial and MindTouch.

Mobile API 
Mobile APIs are based on becoming more focused in using WOA technology. Creating these services have become easier using simplified web protocols, e.g. REST and JSON (JavaScript Object Notation).

These protocols are much easier for web developers, as they require less CPU and bandwidth. They are more recognised because of large social platforms, such as Facebook, Amazon and Twitter etc.

Differences between WOA and SOA 
Web-Oriented Architecture (WOA) is a subset of Service-Oriented Architecture (SOA). SOA (service-oriented architecture) is a modular approach to software development based on the use of distributed, loosely coupled interchangeable components with standardised interfaces for communication over standardised protocols. Web-oriented architecture differs in that it uses a REST approach. REST (Representational State Transfer) is an approach to the architecture of networking protocols that provide access to information resources. Web architecture involves studying the target user, to optimise the website in terms of user flow and structure. The best known system built largely on REST architecture is the modern World Wide Web. Data must be transmitted in a small number of standard formats (e.g. HTML, XML, JSON). The network protocol supports caching, does not depend on a network layer, and does not store state information between request-response pairs. This approach ensures scalability of the system and allows it to easily evolve with new requirements.

See also
 Service-oriented architecture (SOA)
 Resource-oriented architecture (ROA)
 Microservices

References

External links 
 Web Oriented Architecture at Oracle
 Web Oriented Architecture at Gluecon 2010
 WOA: Putting the Web Back in Web Services
 Lean Development Applied to SOA
 WOA: A New Enterprise Partner for Linked Data

Service-oriented (business computing)
Enterprise application integration
Software architecture